Los Molinos Observatory (OALM; obs. code: 844) is an astronomical observatory owned by the Ministerio de Educación y Cultura de Uruguay and operated in collaboration with the University of the Republic's Astronomy Department. It is located near the city of Las Piedras, on the outskirts of Montevideo, Uruguay.

The observatory is actively involved in follow-up observations of small bodies in the Solar System such as asteroids and comets. It has the observatory code 844.

The main-belt asteroid 10476 Los Molinos, discovered by American astronomer Schelte Bus at the Siding Spring Observatory in 1981, was named after this observatory. The official naming citation was published on 13 April 2017 by the Minor Planet Center.

Discoveries 

 Main belt asteroid, 68853 Vaimaca, 
 Main belt asteroid, 73342 Guyunusa, 
 Variable star, VSX J034330.8-442815, 
 Variable star, VSX J074722.4+220414,

References

External links 
 Official "UNESCO" AR 127 telescope giving to "Los Molinos"
 Physical and dynamical characteristics of icy "dwarf planets" (plutoids) – Gonzalo Tancredi, Observatorio Astronómico Los Molinos

Astronomical observatories
Minor-planet discovering observatories
Buildings and structures in Montevideo